Santa Paravia en Fiumaccio is a video game in which each player becomes the ruler of a fledgling Italian city-state around the year 1400. The goal of the game is to become king or queen; to do so the player must manage their city-state so that it may grow.

The game, by George Blank, first appeared in the December 1978 issue of  SoftSide magazine, (Milford, NH), and was published for sale on tape cassette as a computer game by Instant Software (Peterborough, NH) for the Radio Shack TRS-80, Apple II, TI-99/4A, and Commodore PET. It has been translated into many languages, such as ANSI C, and has been ported to the Palm Pilot.

Gameplay
The game consists of yearly turns, beginning in 1400; each turn involves the allocation of grain, counted in steres, and funds, counted in florins, attempting to grow the colony in both population and size. A ruler must ensure that sufficient grain supplies are available to feed his people; by distributing excess grain, a ruler can encourage more citizens to move into his city-state. However, often famine and rats cause grain reserves to diminish.

Funds can be spent to purchase more land, military forces, or various types of structures. These structures include revenue producing mills and markets as well as prestigious palaces and cathedrals. (The 'SoftSide' version had a code error that allowed you to keep all your grain, even when you went bankrupt.)

The different social classes present in this game are serfs, clergy, merchants and nobility.

Based loosely on the text game Hamurabi, Santa Paravia and Fiumaccio was an early god game. It combined 'guns and butter' economic tradeoffs with graphic development of a kingdom with buildings being constructed and shown on the screen as well as character development, shown as progressive promotions from baron to king.

Reviews
Moves #56, p27

See also 
 Dukedom, a 1976 fief management game
 Dynasty, a 1978 province management game set in the Hunan under the Yuan dynasty
 Hamurabi, a 1968 city management game

References

External links 

 (Source code of the game)

Santa Paravia en Fiumaccio at Gamebase 64

1978 video games
Amiga games
Apple II games
Atari 8-bit family games
Atari ST games
City-building games
Commercial video games with freely available source code
Commodore 128 games
Commodore 64 games
Commodore PET games
DOS games
Instant Software games
Multiplayer and single-player video games
Public-domain software with source code
Strategy video games
TI-99/4A games
TRS-80 games
Video games developed in the United States
Video games set in Italy
Video games set in the 15th century
Video games set in the Middle Ages
Video games with textual graphics